Thomas Connor (1842 – Unknown) was a U.S. sailor stationed aboard the  during the American Civil War. He received the Medal of Honor for his actions during the Second Battle of Fort Fisher on January 15, 1865.

Military service
Emigrating from his native Ireland, Connor volunteered for service in the U.S. Navy and was assigned to the Union steam frigate . His enlistment is credited to the state of Maryland.

On January 15, 1865 the North Carolina Confederate stronghold of Fort Fisher was taken by a combined Union landing party of sailors, U.S. Marines, and soldiers under the command of Admiral David Dixon Porter and General Alfred Terry. Connor was one of nine crewmen from the USS Minnesota who received the Medal of Honor for their actions during the battle.

Medal of Honor citation
"The President of the United States of America, in the name of Congress, takes pleasure in presenting the Medal of Honor to Ordinary Seaman Thomas Connor, United States Navy, for extraordinary heroism in action while serving on board the U.S.S. Minnesota, in action during the assault on Fort Fisher, North Carolina, 15 January 1865. Landing on the beach with the assaulting party from his ship, Ordinary Seaman Connor charged up to the palisades and, when more than two-thirds of the men became seized with panic and retreated on the run, risked his life to remain with a wounded officer. With the enemy concentrating his fire on the group, he waited until after dark before assisting in carrying the wounded man from the field."

General Orders: War Department, General Orders No. 59 (June 22, 1865)

Action Date: January 15, 1865

Service: Navy

Rank: Ordinary Seaman

Division: U.S.S. Minnesota

See also

List of Medal of Honor recipients
List of American Civil War Medal of Honor recipients: A–F

Notes

External links

1842 births
19th-century Irish people
Year of death missing
Irish emigrants to the United States (before 1923)
People of Maryland in the American Civil War
Union Navy sailors
United States Navy Medal of Honor recipients
Irish-born Medal of Honor recipients
American Civil War recipients of the Medal of Honor